Ardin Bayata Diale (born 23 August 1988) is a professional boxer from the Philippines who challenged for the WBO flyweight title in 2011, losing to Julio César Miranda by technical knockout. Later on, Diale has settled into a gatekeeper role, holding losses to Juan Francisco Estrada, Koki Eto, and Daigo Higa.

Diale has held the OPBF title between 2015 and 2016. He won the title by beating Renoel Pael by unanimous decision, and defended it successfully once before losing to Higa. Diale has also held the WBC International, Games and Amusements Board, and WBO Oriental flyweight titles at other points in his career.

Professional boxing record

References

External links
 

1988 births
Living people
Flyweight boxers
Filipino male boxers
People from Sarangani